Predator Hawk is a tactical ballistic missile system developed and manufacture by Israel Military Industries (IMI) and used by Israel Defense Forces. It has a maximum range of 300-400 km with a 140-220 kg unitary warhead and accuracy of 10 m CEP.

The missile is sealed in a Launch Pod Container (LPC), with each LPC contains 2 missiles. The Predator Hawk missiles can be launched by a LYNX (MRL) launcher on an 8x8 vehicle, as well as from a variety of other available launchers.

See also
 LORA (missile)
 LAR-160
 Ghaznavi
 Abdali-I
 Shaheen-I
 J-600T Yıldırım
 Fateh-313
 Qiam 1
 B-611
 DF-11
 Al Hussein (missile)
 Burkan-1
 Sky Spear
 ACCULAR
 EXTRA
 ATACMS

References

Rocket weapons
Tactical ballistic missiles
Guided missiles of Israel